Limonethe is a genus of ichneumon wasps in the family Ichneumonidae. There are about five described species in Limonethe. They can be distinguished from similar genera based on the nearly square-shaped areolet and the large and dense punctures on the post-petiole. Many also have infuscated wings, a red abdomen, black head and mesosoma with narrow white markings along the inner eye margins. Limonethe occurs in the New World from Canada to Argentina.

Species
These five species belong to the genus Limonethe:
 Limonethe annulicornis (Ashmead, 1895) c
 Limonethe beckeri (Costa Lima & Guitton, 1961) c g
 Limonethe maurator (Brulle, 1846) c g b
 Limonethe meridionalis (Cresson, 1865) c g
 Limonethe scutellata (Brulle, 1846) c g
Data sources: i = ITIS, c = Catalogue of Life, g = GBIF, b = Bugguide.net

References

Further reading
 
 
 

Ichneumoninae